Pughe is a surname. Notable people with the surname include:

Hugh Pughe Lloyd (1894–1981), British Royal Air Force commander
J. S. Pughe (1870–1909), Welsh-born American political cartoonist
William Owen Pughe (1759–1835), Welsh antiquarian and grammarian

See also
Pugh